Pabargad Fort is a fort located  from Igatpuri via Bhandardara. The fort is in Akole taluka in Ahmednagar district, of Maharashtra. The trek to this fort is difficult.

History
Not much history of the fort is known.

How to reach
The fort is accessible in all seasons except rainy season. The fort is located on Igatpuri-Bhandardara-Sangamner road. There are two trek routes starting from village Guhire. A narrow path behind the hanuman temple leads to the fort. The trek route passes through dense jungle and shrubs of Strobilanthes callosus (Karvi). It takes about three hours to reach the fort. The trek route passes through three plateaues and the final scarp to reach the top of the fort.

Places to see
There are rock cut water cisterns and remains of dilapidated buildings on the fort. There is rock cut sculpture of Hanuman god on the way to the fort. There are natural caves on the hillock adjacent to the fort. There are rock cut steps to reach the top of fort. There are 4 rock cut water cisterns and temple of Bhairoba god and idol of Ganesha.

See also 
 List of forts in Maharashtra
 List of forts in India
 Marathi People
 List of Maratha dynasties and states

References  

 Buildings and structures of the Maratha Empire
Forts in Ahmednagar district